Shoreline Metro (formerly Sheboygan Transit) is the bus system owned and operated by the city of Sheboygan, Wisconsin. Shoreline Metro services three communities with fixed route public transit system including the City of Sheboygan, Sheboygan Falls and Kohler. It operates ten fixed routes Monday through Saturday and tripper service during the school year with an additional three morning routes and four afternoon routes for school-aged children.
  
The system is publicly operated by the City of Sheboygan under the authority of the Sheboygan Transit Commission and managed by the Director of Transit & Parking.

History 
Shoreline Metro has been in service since 1972, but traces its formation back to the Sheboygan City Railway Company in 1886. Various private companies have succeeded each other in the area, transitioning from light rail to streetcars to buses. The system changed their name in October 2010 from Sheboygan Transit to "Lakeshore Metro", but changed it further to "Shoreline Metro" February 2011 due to a trademark conflict with an already existing private paratransit company, Lakeshore Transportation.

Bus fleet 
Shoreline Metro operates with 15 Gillig Low Floor Buses, seven Chance buses and four Rapid Transit Series buses.

Sheboygan Transit Center
Shoreline Metro has an air conditioned transfer center built in 1991 located in the central business district at 828 Pennsylvania Avenue, providing safe shelter for Shoreline Metro passengers. In addition to being a transfer point for all Shoreline Metro fixed routes, the transfer center is the location in the City of Sheboygan where passengers can access various intercity bus services, including Indian Trails, Jefferson Lines, Lamers Connect (on weekends), and the transportation service to and from Lakeshore Technical College’s Cleveland Campus (which is operated by GO Riteway). Amenities at the transfer center include a vending machine selling Shoreline Metro fare media, Wi-Fi, a customer service office that is staffed during the daytime on weekdays, and bike racks. Transferring is made easier for passengers, as the individual routes have assigned bus stalls.

Route list
All routes depart from the "Metro Center", more known as the "Transfer Point" located directly south of Sheboygan City Hall off Center Avenue.

 Blue indicates route serving north side.
 Red indicates route serving south side.

Ridership

Between 2010 and 2018, Shoreline Metro’s ridership grew 20.2 percent and passengers per hour increased 23.1 percent.

References

External links
 Shoreline Metro website

Bus transportation in Wisconsin
Sheboygan, Wisconsin
1972 establishments in Wisconsin